Marine Fighter Attack Squadron 531 (VMFA-531) was a United States Marine Corps fighter squadron consisting of F/A-18 Hornets. Known as the "Grey Ghosts”, the squadron participated in action during World War II and the Vietnam War. They were decommissioned on March 27, 1992.

History

World War II

Marine Night Fighter Squadron 531 (VMF(N)-531) was commissioned on November 16, 1942 at Marine Corps Air Station Cherry Point, North Carolina.  On January 9, 1943 the squadron became part of the Fleet Marine Force and on April 1 was absorbed by Marine Aircraft Group 53 (MAG-53).  The squadron took delivery of its first non-trainer aircraft, the Lockheed PV-1 Ventura on February 15.  Due to the uniqueness of their night fight mission, VMF(N)-531 was placed under the direction of the Commandant of the Marine Corps until it was ready to deploy to combat.

Responding to Japanese night attacks on Guadalcanal, MAG-53 was reassigned to the 3rd Marine Aircraft Wing on April 15, 1943 and was quickly ordered to deploy to the South Pacific as soon as possible.  VMF(N)-531 was the first combat squadron to leave MCAS Cherry Point.  After layovers in Hawaii and Espiritu Santo, the squadron finally arrived at Renard Field on Banika in the Russell Islands on September 11.  Joining Marine Aircraft Group 21, 1st Marine Aircraft Wing, the Grey Ghosts flew their first combat patrol on September 16 making them the first naval aviation night-fighter squadron to operate in the South Pacific.  The squadron's first kill was made by Captain Duane Jenkins, who happened upon a Betty bomber on the evening of November 13, 1943.

The first kill aided by GCI did not come until December 6. During their tour in the Pacific, the squadron operated out of fields in the Russell Islands, Vella Lavella and Bougainville. They accounted for 12 enemy planes shot down by 5 different crews, all at night,  with a loss of 6 of their own aircraft and 17 crew members, none of them a result of enemy fire.
The squadron returned to MCAS Cherry Point on September 1, 1944 and was quickly deactivated only to be reactivated a short time later on October 13 at Marine Corps Auxiliary Airfield Kinston (MCAAF Kinston), North Carolina and reassigned to MAG-53, 9th Marine Aircraft Wing. A short time later the squadron moved to Marine Corps Air Station Eagle Mountain Lake near Fort Worth, Texas to operate as a training squadron for replacement pilots and ground control intercept operators being sent overseas.

Following the conclusion of World War II, the squadron was relocated back to MCAS Cherry Point and in March 1947 reassigned to the 2nd Marine Aircraft Wing (2nd MAW).

1950s

The Vietnam War
On April 10, 1965, 15 F-4Bs from the squadron arrived at Da Nang Air Base, South Vietnam becoming the first land-based Marine Corps jets during the Vietnam War.  They immediately began flying bombing missions under radar guidance and standard close air support missions in support of Marines on the ground.

The 1980s to 1992
On May 29, 1983, 531 received its first F/A-18 Hornet, becoming the 3rd fleet squadron to receive the new fighter.

LtCol Keith J. Stalder was the commanding officer from December 1990 to the time the squadron was decommissioned March 21, 1992.

Gallery

See also
 VMF(N)-531 GCI Detachment
 United States Marine Corps Aviation
 List of United States Marine Corps aircraft squadrons
 List of decommissioned United States Marine Corps aircraft squadrons

References
Notes

Bibliography

 
Web

 VMFA-531 Unofficial Website)
 (531 Grey Ghost Squadron of the Marine Corps Aviation Association)
 Virtual Grey Ghosts

Fighter attack squadrons of the United States Marine Corps
Inactive units of the United States Marine Corps